Chris Pontius (born July 16, 1974) is an American stunt performer and television personality. He is best known as a cast member of the reality comedy show Jackass and co-host of its spinoff Wildboyz with fellow cast member Steve-O.

Life and career  
Pontius was born on July 16, 1974, in Pasadena, California, and raised in San Luis Obispo. As a teenager, he met his future Jackass collaborators when he was interviewed in skateboarding magazine Big Brother. Pontius went on to write for Big Brother, and was part of the Jackass cast starting with the first episode in 2000.

Role in Jackass
Pontius mostly performs stunts involving nudity, such as him dancing out in public while wearing nothing but a thong. He also mostly performs stunts involving his penis, most notably getting it bitten by a snake, and flying an RC helicopter with his penis by tying thread around it to the RC helicopter. He also performs stunts and pranks which involve playing different characters, such as dressing up as the devil while walking through the streets and holding up a sign that reads "Keep God out of California".

Personal life 
In 2004, Pontius married Claire Nolan. The couple split in 2009. In 2011, Nolan filed for divorce and finalized in 2013. Pontius is currently married to Mae Quijada. They have one son born in 2019.

Filmography

Movies

Television

DVDs

Web series

Video games

Music videos

References

External links

 Official website
 

1974 births
American male television actors
Male actors from Pasadena, California
American stunt performers
Jackass (TV series)
People from San Luis Obispo, California
Living people